Thomas Fahrner (born 7 February 1963 in Ludwigshafen, Rhineland-Palatinate) is a former freestyle swimmer from Germany. At the 1984 Summer Olympics in Los Angeles Fahrner earned two medals bronze in the 200 m freestyle and silver in 4×200 m freestyle relay. He also set an Olympic record for the 400 m freestyle (3:50.91) in the B final. Four years later at the 1988 Summer Olympics in Seoul he earned another medal this time a bronze medal in the 4×200 m freestyle relay.

Fahrner attended the University of Southern California.

See also
 List of German records in swimming

References

 

German male swimmers
1963 births
Olympic silver medalists for West Germany
Olympic bronze medalists for West Germany
Swimmers at the 1984 Summer Olympics
Swimmers at the 1988 Summer Olympics
Living people
Sportspeople from Ludwigshafen
University of Southern California alumni
World record setters in swimming
Olympic bronze medalists in swimming
German male freestyle swimmers
World Aquatics Championships medalists in swimming
European Aquatics Championships medalists in swimming
Medalists at the 1988 Summer Olympics
Medalists at the 1984 Summer Olympics
Olympic silver medalists in swimming
Universiade medalists in swimming
Universiade bronze medalists for West Germany
Medalists at the 1985 Summer Universiade
20th-century German people
21st-century German people